The 1917 Texas Longhorns football team represented the University of Texas at Austin in the 1917 college football season.

Schedule

References

Texas
Texas Longhorns football seasons
Texas Longhorns football